Power pack or powerpack may refer to:

Devices
 Power Pack (battery series), a line of multi-cell batteries originally manufactured by Everready
 Powerpack (drivetrain), a term for a modular powertrain, particularly in heavy-duty uses such as construction, military, and railways
 Powerpack (rocket engine), the set of valves and turbopumps that provide the proper fuel/oxidizer mix to the injectors and combustion chamber in a liquid chemical rocket engine
 Tesla Powerpack, a 200 kWh rechargeable lithium-ion battery for industrial usage
 A series of batteries (or battery cells) also called a battery pack
 A power supply (especially in the context of model trains,  slot cars, and other hobbies)
 A radioisotope thermoelectric generator

Entertainment and media
 Power Pack, Marvel Comics' preteen superhero team
A science fiction term for an advanced battery pack or other power supply

Other uses
 Operation Power Pack, a United States military action in the Dominican Republic in 1965

See also

 
 
 Pack (disambiguation)
 Power (disambiguation)